Ashbrook is a large lunar impact crater that is located in the vicinity of the south pole on the far side of the Moon, and so cannot be viewed directly from the Earth. The eastern face of the crater has been overlain by the similar-sized Drygalski, and more than half the interior floor of Ashbrook is covered by the outer ramparts and ejecta of Drygalski. To the northwest is the walled plain Zeeman.

The surviving outer rim of Ashbrook is worn and eroded by subsequent impacts, although much of the original formation is still visible. If the crater once possessed a central peak, it is now buried by the ejecta from Drygalski. Only a section of the interior floor near the southwest rim is flat, being marked only by tiny craterlets.

This crater was previously designated Drygalski Q before being assigned a name by the IAU.

References

External links
 

Impact craters on the Moon